From Dreams or Angels is the fifth album by Abney Park released in 2001.

Track listing
All information from band's website.
"The Root Of All Evil" - 4:07
"Tiny Monster" - 2:58
"Holy War" - 4:24
"Kine" - 4:30
"Breathe" - 3:52
"Hush" - 3:14
"Thorns & Brambles" - 3:42
"Child King" - 5:02
"The Box" - 2:59
"Twisted & Broken" - 3:58
"Breathe (acoustic)" - 3:42

Twisted & Broken
A companion remix album, Twisted & Broken, was released in 2003.

Track listing
"Holy War (remix by Gossamer)"
"The Wake (remix by the Mercy Cage)"
"Tiny Monster (cover by Xanther)"
"Vengeance (remix by Sinforosa)"
"The Wake (remix by Hanging Man)"
"Hush (remix by Falling You)"
"Black Day (cover by Dark Aeons)"
"Twisted & Broken (remix by Lethargic Dance)"
"Vengeance (remix by Mephisto Walz)"

Credits
 Robert Brown - Vocals
 Kristina Erickson - Keyboards
 Josh Goering - Guitar
 Rob Hazelton - Additional Guitar
 Robert Gardunia - Bass
 Madame Archel - Flute and Backing Vocals

References

Abney Park (band) albums
2001 albums